Mohd Fauzi Nan is a Malaysian footballer who last played for Negeri Sembilan FA in the Malaysian Premier League as a defender before retiring. He previously played for Kedah, Selangor MPPJ and Perlis FA . He is the current head coach of Kedah U-21 .

Career as player
In the 2009 pre-season he was supposed to sign a contract with his former team, Kedah but later changed his mind and played for their neighbouring team and rivals Perlis instead. He became a squad member of Kedah for the 2011 season eventually. He is also a Malaysian national team member, playing in the 2007 Asian Cup Final and the 2010 AFF Suzuki Cup.

He was also part of the Malaysia XI squad that faced Chelsea F.C. in 2008 where Malaysia lost 0–2.

Career as coach
On 2019, Fauzi Nan was appointed an assistant coach at Kedah U-21 under coach Mohd Azraai Khor Abdullah. In 2020 he coaches Kedah FA President's Cup U-21 squad.

Managerial statistics

External links
 

1980 births
Living people
Malaysian people of Malay descent
Malaysian footballers
Malaysia international footballers
2007 AFC Asian Cup players
Kedah Darul Aman F.C. players
Perlis FA players
Negeri Sembilan FA players
People from Kedah
Malaysia Super League players
Association football defenders